Hooker Glacier may refer to:

 Hooker Glacier (Antarctica)
 Hooker Glacier (New Zealand) in New Zealand
 Hooker Glacier (Wyoming) in Wyoming, USA